Tiz or TIZ may refer to:

 Tīz, Iran, a village in Iran
 Tiz Tiz, Iran, another village in Iran
 TIZ (motorcycle), a Russian motorcycle manufacturer
 TIZ: Tokyo Insect Zoo, a Sony Playstation game
 Mr Tiz, a champion New Zealand thoroughbred racehorse
 Tari Airport (IATA Code), in Papua New Guinea
 Traffic Information Zone, in a flight information service
Tiz, a respectful Gender Neutral word for Sir or Ma’am, short for citizen.

People with the name Tiz
 Katy Tiz (born 1988), English singer-songwriter
 Tiz Zaqyah (born 1988), Malaysian actress, model and singer